The Dubarry is a 1951 German musical film directed by Georg Wildhagen and Reinhold Schünzel and starring Sari Barabas, Willy Fritsch and Albert Lieven. It is named after the operetta Die Dubarry, but uses the work only as a background.It was made at the Wandsbek Studios in Hamburg. The film's sets were designed by the art directors Willi Herrmann and Heinrich Weidemann.

Cast
 Sari Barabas as Jeanne Fabiani / Madame Dubarry
 Willy Fritsch as Louis Valmont
 Albert Lieven as Alfred Collien
 Walter Müller as Cäsar Schnepf
 Eva Ingeborg Scholz as Kitty Lenz
 Inge Meysel as Charlotte Adrian, Pensionsinhaberin
 Loni Heuser as Lola Violetta
 Madelon Truß as Fifi, Fotomodell
 Lorley Katz
 Hubert von Meyerinck as Stranitzky, Schmierendirektor
 Ernst Waldow as Erban, Theaterdirektor
 Fritz Imhoff as Schaubitzer, Theateragent
 Carl-Heinz Schroth as Scharlakan
 Helmuth Rudolph as Dr. Steffens, Kritiker
 Hans Heinz Bollmann as Orgass, Agent
 Joachim Teege as Alphonse Meyer, Fotograf
 Mathieu Ahlersmeyer as König
 Alexander Hunzinger
 Herbert Ernst Groh

References

Bibliography 
 Kurt Gänzl. The Encyclopedia of the Musical Theatre: A-Gi. Schirmer Books, 2001.

External links 
 

1951 films
1950s musical drama films
German musical drama films
West German films
1950s German-language films
Films directed by Georg Wildhagen
Films directed by Reinhold Schünzel
Films based on operettas
Films about singers
Cultural depictions of Madame du Barry
1951 drama films
German black-and-white films
1950s German films
Films shot at Wandsbek Studios